Naomi Namsi Shaban is a Kenyan politician from the border town of Taveta. Born of pare  descent she became the first woman elected to represent the Taveta Constituency in Parliament in 2002 through a Kenya African National Union (KANU) ticket. She defended the seat in 2007 election through KANU and won. Later she joined the National Alliance Party (TNA) and was re-elected to represent Taveta Constituency in the National Assembly of Kenya in 2013. In 2017 she was re-elected again for a record fourth term in a highly controversial way as her main opponent Morris Mutiso cried foul play and sought for the results to be annulled on grounds of irregularities and illegalities.

In 2008 To 2010: she was appointed Minister of State for Special Programmes, Kenya; later she was reshuffled and in August 2010, she became Minister for Gender and Children Affairs.

Although she has managed to keep her children's fathers and marriages a mystery, She is a mother to three.

She is the current Deputy Leader of Majority Party in the Parliament of Kenya, a member of the Parliamentary Committee on Appointments, House Business Committee and Health Committee.
2003 – 2007: Kenya Branch Representative – Commonwealth Parliamentary Association

References

Year of birth missing (living people)
Kenya African National Union politicians
Members of the National Assembly (Kenya)
Living people
21st-century Kenyan women politicians
21st-century Kenyan politicians